AVT may refer to:

 Advanced volatile threat, cyberattack not requiring file on hard drive
 Alijah Vera-Tucker, American football player
 Arginine vasotocin, a hormone
 Asociación de Víctimas del Terrorismo (Association of Victims of Terrorism), Spain
 Audiovisual translation, a specialized branch of translation
 Avnet, American electronics company (NASDAQ stock symbol AVT)
 AVT Statistical filtering algorithm
 US Navy Aircraft Transports, see list of auxiliaries of the United States Navy